The Diocese of Sufar, is an ancient episcopal seat of the Roman province of Mauretania Caesariensis.
The location of the seat of the bishopric is now lost to history, but it was somewhere in today's Algeria.

Christianity seems to have come to Mauretania Caesariensis later than other parts of Roman North Africa, thereby avoiding many of the earlier controversies. Like most bishopric in the west of the province Sufar appears to have flourished only from in late antiquity some time after the Council of Nicaea. There are only Two bishops of Sufar mentioned by the ancient sources, both in the year 484. This leads Mesnage to hypothesize the existence of two towns called Sufar, An alternative interpretation is that the term Sufaritanus is the contraction of Sufasaritanus, and in this case one of the two bishops of 484 would belong to the diocese of Sufasar.
Sufar seems to have ceased to effectively function only with the Muslim conquest of the Maghreb.

Today Sufar survives as a titular bishopric and the current bishop is Robert P. Reed, who replaced Robert Francis Prevost in 2016.

Known bishops
 Vittore (fl.484)
 Romano  (fl.484)
 Patrick Joseph Casey (1965–1969)
 Carlos Schmitt (1970–1971)
 Ernst Gutting (1971–2013)
 Robert Francis Prevost (2014–2015)
 Robert P. Reed (2016–current)

See also
Mauretania Caesariensis
Sufasar

References

Roman towns and cities in Mauretania Caesariensis
Catholic titular sees in Africa
Ancient Berber cities